Arabs in Finland are residents and citizens of Finland who speak the Arabic language.

Status of Arabic
Arabic has for a long time been taught in Finnish schools as a native language for Arabs. Starting from 2019 fall, Arabic will be an optional B2 language in Finnish primary schools. As an academic subject it can be learned at University of Helsinki.

Demographics
Arabic is Finland's third most spoken foreign language, after Russian and Estonian. As of 2018, 29,462 people speak it as their mother tongue.

Society
The majority of Finnish Arabs have arrived as refugees and have lived in Finland for less than five years. 37% of Arabs feel that they are Finnish, and 57% have experienced discrimination in the labour market. One in three Arabs lack Finnish friends.

During Helsinki New Year's Eve sexual assaults, Arabs in Facebook discussed how they could clear their reputation.

Notable Finnish people of Arab descent

References

Arab diaspora in Europe
Ethnic groups in Finland
Demographics of Finland